Daniel M. Nakamura better known by his stage name Dan the Automator, is an American record producer from San Francisco, California. He is the founder of the publishing company Sharkman Music and the record label 75 Ark.

Early life
Nakamura was born in San Francisco, California, on 20 December 1968. His parents spent time in Japanese internment camps as children. His father worked for the San Francisco Redevelopment Agency and his mother taught at City College of San Francisco. As a child, he learned to play violin. While in high school, he became immersed in hip hop culture. He graduated from San Francisco State University.

Career
Nakamura started his career as a DJ when he was a teenager. After seeing the younger DJs DJ Qbert and Mix Master Mike performing live, he decided to focus on producing tracks. He first gained attention for his work on Kool Keith's 1996 album Dr. Octagonecologyst. His debut EP, Music to Be Murdered By, was released in 1989. He released his debut album A Much Better Tomorrow in 2000, an expansion of his 1996 EP A Better Tomorrow. Keith featured extensively across both versions.

He composed the score for the 2019 comedy film Booksmart, with the soundtrack album released that same year.

Collaborations
In 1999, Nakamura and Prince Paul formed the collaborative project Handsome Boy Modeling School, assuming the alter egos Nathaniel Merriweather and Chest Rockwell, respectively. Their debut album So... How's Your Girl? featured numerous guest musicians, including Róisín Murphy, DJ Shadow, and Del the Funky Homosapien. They released a second album, White People, in November 2004, with collaborators including RZA, Cat Power, and Mike Patton. Nakamura used the Nathaniel Merriweather pseudonym for his Lovage, his project with Patton and Jennifer Charles. After Paul briefly left the duo over a business dispute, Handsome Boy Modelling School have since played further shows and spoken of a forthcoming third album.

In 2000, Nakmura joined Del the Funky Homosapien and Kid Koala to form Deltron 3030. They released their eponymous debut album the same year, featuring guest appearances by Sean Lennon and Damon Albarn. In 2001 he produced the debut album of Albarn's "animated" band Gorillaz, appearing as a member of the band, alongside Del the Funky Homosapien. Both would later appear on the belated second Deltron 3030 record, Event 2, released in September 2013. The album also featured appearances by Jamie Cullum, Emily Wells and Zack De La Rocha, with interludes performed by actors David Cross, Amber Tamblyn and Joseph Gordon-Levitt.

Nakamura is one half of Got a Girl, along with actress Mary Elizabeth Winstead. The duo's debut album, I Love You but I Must Drive Off This Cliff Now, was released in 2014. In September 2015, they embarked on a four-city tour of Seattle, San Francisco, New York City, and Los Angeles, where they played their entire album live, including a cover of Handsome Boy Modeling School's "I've Been Thinking".

In 2023, Handsome Boy Modeling School released a limited release LP of 7 new songs in collaboration with Fords Gin.

Discography

Studio albums
 A Much Better Tomorrow (2000)
 Booksmart: Score by Dan the Automator (2019)
 Easter Sunday: Music from the motion picture  (2022)

Compilation albums
 Wanna Buy a Monkey? (2002)
 Dan the Automator Presents 2K7 (2006)

Remix albums 
Bombay The Hard Way: Guns, Cars and Sitars (1998)

EPs
 Music to Be Murdered By (1989)
 King of the Beats (1990)
 A Better Tomorrow (1996)

Singles
 "Bear Witness III (Once Again)" (2002)
 "Rapper's Delight" (2009)

Productions
 Dr. Octagon - Dr. Octagonecologyst (1996)
 Cornershop - When I Was Born for the 7th Time (1997)
 Kalyanji–Anandji - Bombay the Hard Way: Guns, Cars and Sitars (1998)
 Jon Spencer Blues Explosion - Acme (1998)
 Handsome Boy Modeling School - So... How's Your Girl? (1999)
 Primal Scream - XTRMNTR (2000)
 Deltron 3030 - Deltron 3030 (2000)
 Gorillaz -  Gorillaz (2001)
 Lovage - Music to Make Love to Your Old Lady By (2001)
 Ben Lee - Hey You. Yes You. (2002)
 Galactic - Ruckus (2003)
 Handsome Boy Modeling School - White People (2004)
 Head Automatica - Decadence (2004)
 Jamie Cullum - Catching Tales (2005)
 Teriyaki Boyz - Beef or Chicken (2005)
 Peeping Tom - Peeping Tom (2006)
 Little Barrie - Stand Your Ground (2006)
 Josh Haden - Devoted (2007)
 Men Without Pants - Naturally (2008)
 Anaïs Croze - The Love Album (2008)
 Kasabian - West Ryder Pauper Lunatic Asylum (2009)
 Dredg - Chuckles and Mr. Squeezy (2011)
 Miles Kane - Colour of the Trap (2011)
 Lateef the Truthspeaker - Firewire (2011)
 Kasabian - Velociraptor! (2011)
 DRC Music - Kinshasa One Two (2011)
 Pillowfight - Pillowfight (2013)
 Jamie Cullum - Momentum (2013)
 Deltron 3030 - Event 2 (2013)
 Got a Girl - I Love You but I Must Drive Off This Cliff Now (2014)
 Dr. Octagon - Moosebumps: An Exploration Into Modern Day Horripilation (2018)

Film Music/Scoring 

 Scream 2 - "Right Place Wrong Time" (1997)
 Ocean's Eleven - "The Projects (P Jays)" (2001) 
 Slackers - "Rock n' Roll (Could Never Hip Hop Like This)," "Holy Calamity" (2002)
 Blade II - "Gorillaz on my Mind" (2002) 
 Tony Hawk's Underground - "A Better Tomorrow," "Positive Contact'' (2003) 
 Tony Hawk's Underground 2 - "Holy Calamity (Bear Witness II)" (2004) 
 Charmed - "Fallen" (2005) 
 Californication - "Mojo" (2007) 
 The Sopranos - Stage 5 Remix (2007)
 Scott Pilgrim vs The World - "Slick (Patel's Song)" (featuring Satya Bhabha), "Ninja Ninja Revolution" (2010) 
 Better Call Saul - "The Truth" (2015)
 Money Monster - "What Makes the World Go Round? (Money!)" "Da Da Da" (2016)
 Booksmart - Original Score & Music 
 Always Be My Maybe - "Hello Peril" "I Punched Keanu Reeves" (2019)
 Broken Bread - Original Score Season 1 (2019) 
 Holidate - Original Score (2020) 
 Dash & Lilly - Original Score (2020)
 Salt & Pepa - Music (2021)
 Easter Sunday - Original Score (2022)

References

External links

 

Living people
1966 births
American musicians of Japanese descent
American hip hop record producers
Record producers from California
Hip hop musicians from San Francisco
Businesspeople from San Francisco
San Francisco State University alumni
Lovage (band) members
Head Automatica members
Deltron 3030 members